Grewal or Garewal is a family name historically used in India and Pakistan as a gotra (clan) of Jat people.

Notable people 
Alexi Grewal, an Olympic Gold medalist and cyclist;
Gippy Grewal, a singer, actor, and producer;
Gurbir Grewal, the current Attorney General of New Jersey;
Gurcharan Singh Grewal, an Olympic Gold medalist and field hockey player;
Gurmant Grewal, a former 3-term Member of Parliament in Canada and Deputy House Leader;
Hardeep Grewal, Ontario MPP
Inderpal Grewal, a professor of Women's, Gender and Sexuality Studies at Yale University;
J. S. Grewal, an Indian writer, historian, and scholar;
Nina Grewal, a former 4-term Member of Parliament in Canada. Nina and Gurmant Grewal were the first married couple to concurrently serve in the Canadian Parliament;
Sarla Grewal, Indian bureaucrat;
Mehtab Singh Grewal, royal Home minister in the court of Maharaja Hira Singh of Nabha State.

References

Punjabi tribes
Jat clans
Jat clans of Punjab
Punjabi-language surnames
Hindu surnames
Indian surnames